The 2006–07 Texas Tech Red Raiders men's basketball team represented Texas Tech University in the Big 12 Conference during the 2006–07 NCAA Division I men's basketball season. The head coach was Bob Knight, his 6th year with the team. The Red Raiders played their home games in the United Spirit Arena in Lubbock, Texas.

Roster

References

Texas Tech Red Raiders basketball seasons
Texas Tech
Texas Tech
Texas Tech
Texas Tech